Isak N Jiyeon (이삭 N 지연) was a South Korean R&B duo formed by SM Entertainment in 2002. The duo released one album, Tell Me Baby, in September 2002 before disbanding two years later following Isak’s departure. Later on, Jiyeon joined the line-up of SM's new girl group The Grace which debuted in 2005 while Isak continued to do a variety of work, such as being DJ and VJ for Arirang TV, MC work for various networks, and taking on small acting roles on network television.

Members
 Kim Isak (김이삭)
 Lee Jiyeon (이지연)

Discography

Studio album
Tell Me Baby, released September 2002

Compilations
 2003 Summer Vacation in SMTOWN.com
 2004 Summer Vacation in SMTOWN.com

External links
 Isak N Jiyeon Official homepage
 Isak N Jiyeon in empas people
 Isak N Jiyeon in EPG

References 

SM Town
South Korean girl groups
South Korean contemporary R&B musical groups
Musical groups established in 2002
Musical groups disestablished in 2004
SM Entertainment artists
South Korean musical duos
2002 establishments in South Korea
2004 disestablishments in South Korea